is a retired Japanese hurdler. He is the former national record holder for the 110 metres hurdles and 60 metres hurdles.

He finished fourth at the 2005 Asian Championships and third at the 2006 Asian Games. He also competed at the World Championships in 2001, 2003 and 2005 as well as the 2004 Olympic Games without reaching the final round.

His personal best time is 13.43 seconds in the 110 metres hurdles (Kumagaya 2008) and 7.75 seconds in the 60 metres hurdles (Valencia 2008). The latter is the former national record.

He retired after the 2012 season.

Personal bests

Competition record

National titles
Japanese Championships
110 m hurdles: 2001, 2005, 2006, 2007, 2008

References

External links

Masato Naitō at JAAF 

1980 births
Living people
People from Toyota, Aichi
Sportspeople from Aichi Prefecture
Japanese male hurdlers
Olympic male hurdlers
Olympic athletes of Japan
Athletes (track and field) at the 2004 Summer Olympics
Athletes (track and field) at the 2008 Summer Olympics
Asian Games bronze medalists for Japan
Asian Games medalists in athletics (track and field)
Athletes (track and field) at the 2006 Asian Games
Medalists at the 2006 Asian Games
World Athletics Championships athletes for Japan
Japan Championships in Athletics winners